Fred and Barney Meet the Shmoo is an American animated package show and a spin-off of The Flintstones produced by Hanna-Barbera which aired on NBC from December 8, 1979 to November 15, 1980. The 90-minute show is a repackaging of episodes from Fred and Barney Meet the Thing combined with the addition of The New Shmoo episodes (which was originally broadcast as a stand-alone half-hour series).

The series contained the following three segments:

The New Fred and Barney Show (a revival of The Flintstones) – one episode, 30 minutes
The Thing (based on the Marvel Comics superhero Thing) – two episodes, 11 minutes each
The New Shmoo (based on the Li'l Abner comic strip character Shmoo) – one episode, 30 minutes
 
Despite the show's title, the three segments remained separate and did not crossover with one another. The characters of Fred Flintstone, Barney Rubble, Thing and Shmoo were only featured together in brief bumpers between segments, and the original half-hour episodes of The New Shmoo were now split into two-parters, allowing more mingling and mixing of the program's individual segments. In 1980–81,  Shmoo joined Fred and Barney as part-time police officers on the "Bedrock Cops" segments of The Flintstone Comedy Show.

During the series' initial run, a television special called The Harlem Globetrotters Meet Snow White (also produced by Hanna-Barbera) was shown in four parts on Fred and Barney Meet the Shmoo on four consecutive Saturday mornings (September 27, October 4, 11, 18, 1980), despite having no narrative connection to the show.

Like many animated series created by Hanna-Barbera in the 1970s, the show contained a laugh track, one of their last productions to do so.

Voice cast

The New Fred and Barney Show

Henry Corden as Fred Flintstone
Jean Vander Pyl as Wilma Flintstone, Pebbles Flintstone
Mel Blanc as Barney Rubble, Dino
Gay Autterson as Betty Rubble
Don Messick as Bamm-Bamm Rubble
John Stephenson as Mr. Slate

The Thing

Wayne Norton as Benjy Grimm
Joe Baker as The Thing
Noelle North as Kelly Harkness
Marilyn Schreffler as Betty Harkness, Miss Twilly
John Erwin as Ronald Radford
Art Metrano as Spike
Michael Sheehan as Turkey
John Stephenson as Dr. Harkness, Stretch

The New Shmoo

Frank Welker as Shmoo
Dolores Cantu-Primo as Nita
Bill Idelson as Mickey
Chuck McCann as Billy Joe

References

External links

Fred and Barney Meet the Shmoo at the Big Cartoon DataBase

The Flintstones spin-offs
1979 American television series debuts
1980 American television series endings
1970s American animated television series
1980s American animated television series
American animated television spin-offs
NBC original programming
American children's animated comedy television series
American children's animated mystery television series
American children's animated superhero television series
Li'l Abner
Television series by Hanna-Barbera
English-language television shows
Crossover animated television series
Television series set in prehistory